Jerzkowice  (German Jerskewitz) is a village in the administrative district of Gmina Czarna Dąbrówka, within Bytów County, Pomeranian Voivodeship, in northern Poland.

The village has a population of 301.

References

Jerzkowice